In molecular biology, autophagy related 3 (Atg3) is the E2 enzyme for the LC3 lipidation process. It is essential for autophagy. The super protein complex, the Atg16L complex, consists of multiple Atg12-Atg5 conjugates. Atg16L has an E3-like role in the LC3 lipidation reaction. The activated intermediate, LC3-Atg3 (E2), is recruited to the site where the lipidation takes place.

Atg3 catalyses the conjugation of Atg8 and phosphatidylethanolamine (PE). Atg3 has an alpha/beta-fold, and its core region is topologically similar to canonical E2 enzymes. Atg3 has two regions inserted in the core region and another with a long alpha-helical structure that protrudes from the core region as far as 30 A. It interacts with atg8 through an intermediate thioester bond between Cys-288 and the C-terminal Gly of atg8. It also interacts with the C-terminal region of the E1-like atg7 enzyme.

Autophagocytosis is a starvation-induced process responsible for transport of cytoplasmic proteins to the lysosome/vacuole. Atg3 is a ubiquitin like modifier that is topologically similar to the canonical E2 enzyme. It catalyses the conjugation of Atg8 and phosphatidylethanolamine.

Atg3 consists of three domains, an N-terminal domain, a catalytic domain and a C-terminal domain. The catalytic domain contains a cysteine residue within an HPC motif, this is the putative active-site residue for recognition of the Apg5 subunit of the autophagosome complex. The small C-terminal domain is likely to be a distinct binding region for the stability of the autophagosome complex. It carries a highly characteristic conserved FLKF sequence motif.

References

Protein domains